The 31st Guards Long-Range Aviation Regiment, (originally named the 101st Transport Aviation Regiment before receiving the Guards designation) was a Soviet military aviation regiment subordinate to the 1st Transport Aviation Division. Equipped with Li-2 aircraft converted to drop cargo from the air with parachutes, the unit was originally given long-range transport tasks, such as delivering important cargo to partisan units on the frontlines. Initially the unit was commanded by Valentina Grizodubova, who had been previously awarded the title Hero of the Soviet Union for her record-setting Rodina flight, but after a spat with Air Marshal Golovanov over lack of promotion and the unit not receiving the Guards designation at the time, she was removed from her command post and replaced by the deputy commander in May 1944. Later that year the unit was honored with the Guards designation, and eventually it became the 31st Krasnoselsky Guards Bomber Aviation Regiment (the honorific "Krasnoselsky" having been awarded for the unit's distinction in the battles for Krasnoe Selo).

References 

Bomber aviation units and formations of the Soviet Air Forces
Regiments of the Soviet Air Force in World War II
Air force transport units and formations